Medical protocol may refer to:

 Medical guideline, for a medical treatment
 Medical protocol, a set of rules followed by an emergency medical technician, nurse, physician, therapist, etc.
 Clinical protocol, a method in a clinical trial or medical research study